SS Samalness was a Liberty ship built in the United States during World War II. She was transferred to the British Ministry of War Transportation (MoWT) upon completion.

Construction
Samalness was laid down on 15 January 1944, under a Maritime Commission (MARCOM) contract, MC hull 1517, by J.A. Jones Construction, Brunswick, Georgia; she was sponsored by Mrs. F.W. Prathe, and launched on 29 February 1944.

History
She was allocated to Haldin & Philips, on 11 March 1944. On 30 April 1947, she was sold to the Maritime Shipping & Trading Company, and renamed Castledore. On 28 January 1951, she ran aground off Spain and sank when her propeller fell off.

References

Bibliography

 
 
 
 
 

 

Liberty ships
Ships built in Brunswick, Georgia
1944 ships
Maritime incidents in 1951
Liberty ships transferred to the British Ministry of War Transport